Bury Me in Redwood Country is a 2009 documentary film about the Redwood forest landscape. It is a meditative look at the tallest and largest trees on the planet, offering a reverential perspective that approaches the ecstatic. The film includes interviews with Redwoods experts, foresters, conservationists, native basketweavers, rangers and naturalists, including Steve Sillet and Michael Taylor. The project encapsulated a year of shooting in diverse locations in Redwood National and State Parks, Humboldt Redwoods State Park, Montgomery Woods State Reserve, Sequoia National Park, and others.

Screenings
Opening Night Film, Northwest Projections Film Festival, Bellingham, WA
Feature, Local Sightings Film Festival, Seattle, WA
Bainbridge Performing Arts, Bainbridge Island, WA
Vashon Theatre, Vashon Island, WA
Brown Bag Lunch, Redwood National Park, Orick, CA
DOCTOBER, Pickford Film Center, Bellingham, WA
Wild Rivers 101 Film Festival, Arcata, CA
Whatcom Museum, Bellingham, WA

See also
Sequoia sempervirens
Sequoiadendron giganteum
Sequoia (genus)
Redwood National and State Parks
Sequoia National Park
Kings Canyon National Park
Yosemite National Park
Calaveras Big Trees State Park

References

External links 
 
 

2009 films
Documentary films about forests and trees
Documentary films about spirituality
American independent films
2009 documentary films
2009 independent films
2000s English-language films
2000s American films